Enpinanga is a genus of moths in the family Sphingidae first described by Walter Rothschild and Karl Jordan in 1903.

Species
Enpinanga assamensis (Walker 1856)
Enpinanga borneensis (Butler 1879)
Enpinanga vigens (Butler 1879)

References

Macroglossini
Moth genera
Taxa named by Walter Rothschild
Taxa named by Karl Jordan